EPAS (Electronic Protocols Application Software) is a non-commercial cooperation initiative launched in Europe which aims at developing a series of data protocols to be applied in a point of interaction (POI) environment. 

The project intends to address the three following protocols; a terminal management protocol, a retailer application protocol and an acquirer protocol.

Project Development 

The proposed initiative was structured along the three following main phases  :
Phase I : development of technical specifications and issuance of standards (2006 - mid-2007)
Phase II : development of software and provision of test tools (2007 – 2008)
Phase III : construction of demonstrators (2008)

Participants 

The EPAS Consortium is composed of 24 organisations.

Ingenico (FR)
VeriFone (US)
The Logic Group (UK)
Amadis (CA)
ELITT (FR)
MoneyLine (FR)
Lyra Network (FR)
Atos Worldline (DE)
Wincor Nixdorf (ES)
GIE – Groupement des Cartes Bancaires "CB" (FR) (Co-ordinator)
Desjardins (CA)
Atos Worldline (BE)
Security Research and Consulting (SRC) GmbH (DE)
Equens SE (NL)
Sermepa (ES)
Cetrel (LU)
Total (FR)
Quercia (IT)
University of Applied Sciences, Cologne (DE)
Integri (BE)
PAN Nordic Card Association (PNC) (SE)
GALITT (FR)
BP (GB)
RSC Commercial Services (DE)
Europay Austria Zahlungsverkehrssysteme GmbH (AT)
SIBS (PT)
Thales e-Transactions España (ES)

See also
 EFTPOS
 Open Payment Initiative
 Wire transfer
 Electronic funds transfer
 ERIDANE

External links 
 Official Web site

Sources 
 “Standardisierungsarbeiten im europäischen Zahlungsverkehr - Chancen für SEPA” SRC - Security Research & Consulting GmbH, Bonn - Wiesbaden, Germany, 2006, p. 5, 11 (PDF-transparencies)
 William Vanobberghen, „Le Projet EPAS - Sécurité, protection des personnes et des donnée: de nouvelles technologies et des standards pour fiabiliser le contrôle et l’identification“, Groupement des Cartes Bancaires, 27. June 2006 (PPT-transparencies)
 Hans-Rainer Frank, „SEPA aus Sicht eines europäischen Tankstellenbetreibers“, Arbeitskreis ePayment, Brussels, 11.May 2006, p. 11 (PDF-transparencies)
 GROUPEMENT DES CARTES BANCAIRES, „EUROPEAN STANDARDISATION FOR ELECTRONIC PAYMENTS“,Used to be at: https://web.archive.org/web/20070927174537/http://www.cartes-bancaires.com/en/dossiers/standard.html (dead link as of Okt 2011)
 „EPC Card Fraud Prevention & Security Activities“,Cédric Sarazin – Chairman Card Fraud Prevention TF 19. December 2007,  FPEG Meeting - Brussels, https://web.archive.org/web/20121024081807/http://ec.europa.eu/internal_market/fpeg/docs/sarazin_en.ppt
 "EPAS Members", https://web.archive.org/web/20161220082713/http://nexo-standards.org/members

References

Retail point of sale systems
Payment systems
Banking terms